The Last Sunset is the first full-length album released by the power metal/progressive metal band, Conception. The Last Sunset was originally recorded in 1991 under Conception's own record label CSF Records.

Track listing

Personnel
Credits for The Last Sunset adapted from liner notes.

Conception
 Roy Khan − vocals
 Tore Østby − guitars, arrangements
 Ingar Amlien − bass, vocals
 Arve Heimdal − drums

Additional personnel
 Hans Christian Gjestvang − keyboards
 Staffan William-Olsson − keyboards, mixing
 Christine Meyer − vocals on "Bowed Down with Sorrow"
 Sven Kaare Sunde – vocals
 Vidar Karlsen − vocals

Production
 Nils H. Mæhlum − production, engineering, mixing
 Michael Albers − cover art
 Dag Østby − lyrics ("War of Hate", "Live to Survive", "Among the Gods")
 Tom H. Hansen − photography

References

Conception (band) albums
1991 debut albums
Noise Records albums